Ajnabi Lage Zindagi is a Pakistani drama television series aired on LTN Family in 2019. It features Momina Iqbal, Arslan Asad Butt, Arman Ali Pasha and Ammara Butt in leading roles.

Cast 
 Momina Iqbal as Tabeer
 Arslan Asad Butt as Ahmar
 Arman Ali Pasha as Azaan
 Ammara Butt as Zara
 Munazzah Arif as Rubab Begum
 Zain Afzal as Fahad
 Ismat Iqbal as Hafsa (Tabeer's mother)
 Saima Saleem as Tahira
 Iqra Qaiser as Abeer 
 Haseeb Khan

References

External links 
 

Pakistani drama television series
2019 Pakistani television series debuts